The Sonoma Stompers are a collegiate summer baseball team based in Sonoma, California.  They are current members of the California Collegiate League.  They began play as members of the Pacific Association of Professional Baseball Clubs in 2014.  They are a successor franchise to the defunct Sonoma County Grapes, and were the first professional team to make Sonoma County home since the Sonoma County Crushers ceased play following the 2002 season.

History
The Stompers announced their first professional signing, Tommy Lyons, in March 2014, and shortly thereafter traded for local player, Jayce Ray. The team's first manager was Ray Serrano, who led the Stompers to a 42–36 record in their inaugural season. In 2015, Serrano accepted a full-time position with the Atlanta Braves to serve as the organization's catching instructor.

Former major league pitcher Bill "Spaceman" Lee started a game for the Stompers on August 12, 2014, pitching the team to victory over the Pittsburg Mettle. Lee set a record with the win, becoming the oldest person (at age 67) to ever win a professional baseball game. Lee pitched  innings, and batted for himself.

In 2015, the Sonoma Stompers allowed Ben Lindbergh and Sam Miller of Baseball Prospectus's Effectively Wild podcast to serve as the Baseball Operations department, under General Manager Theo Fightmaster. The duo wrote about their experience in a book entitled The Only Rule is it Has to Work, published in 2016.

The team made history in June 2015, when pitcher Sean Conroy became the first openly gay active professional baseball player.

In June 2016, the Stompers announced that two female baseball players would join their roster starting in July. Upon joining the team, the two players, outfielder-pitcher Kelsie Whitmore and infielder Stacy Piagno, made the Sonoma Stompers the first coed professional baseball team since the 1950s. The Stompers added catcher Anna Kimbrell in July 2016. The Stompers won both the first and second halves of the season, earning their first Pacific Association championship under Manager Takashi Miyoshi. 

After the 2017 season, the Minnesota Twins hired Miyoshi as a coach for Elizabethton Twins.

In 2018, under new General Manager Brett Creamer and Manager Zack Pace, the Sonoma Stompers set a Pacific Association win record going 57-23. Outfielder Kenny Meimerstorf would win Rookie of the Year award by hitting a franchise best 23 home runs. Former Arizona Diamondbacks prospect Daniel Comstock set another single-season franchise record with a .364 average and earned Defensive Player of the Year honors at the catcher position. Pitcher Jacob Cox set the Pacific Association single-season saves record with 26. Pitcher Vijay Patel set the franchise single-season wins record going 9-3 while striking out 92 batters in 84 innings pitched. 

In 2019, the Stompers held a regular season best 45-19 record. Most notably, pitcher Cole Watts and outfielder Dondrei Hubbard signed with Kansas City Royals and San Diego Padres affiliates. The pair became the sixth and seventh Stompers to sign with an affiliated organization. 

In 2021, one year after the Pacific Association's season was cancelled due to the COVID-19 pandemic, the Stompers left the professional ranks and joined the California Collegiate League. 

On May 17, 2022, the Baltimore Orioles recalled RHP Logan Gillaspie from Triple-A Norfolk and optioned INF Rylan Bannon to Triple-A Norfolk. Later that day, Gillaspie made his debut against the New York Yankees where he recorded his first career strikeout against Kyle Higashioka in two scoreless innings pitched. Gillaspie became the first Stompers player to appear in a Major League Baseball game and second Pacific Association player with Chris Mazza being the first in 2019.

Season-by-season results

Notable alumni

 Bill "Spaceman" Lee (2014)
 Jose Canseco (2015)
 Fehlandt Lentini (2015)
 Sean Conroy (2015-2016)
 Anna Kimbrell (2016)
 Kelsie Whitmore (2016-2017)
 Stacy Piagno (2016-2017)
 Logan Gillaspie (2017)
 D.J. Sharabi (2017-2019)

References

External links

 Official website

Pacific Association of Professional Baseball Clubs teams
Sports in Sonoma County, California
Baseball teams established in 2014
2014 establishments in California
Sonoma, California
Baseball teams in the San Francisco Bay Area